This is a list of hartals (labour strikes or collective actions) occurring in Bangladesh (including East Pakistan).

List

References

External links
 Interactive visualizations of Bangladesh's four decades of hartals' compounded impact on its economy.

Bangladesh
Politics of Bangladesh
Bangladesh history-related lists
Economy of Bangladesh-related lists